Mario Moretti Polegato (born 16 August 1952 in Crocetta del Montello, Italy) is an Italian entrepreneur, active in the footwear sector, who founded the company Geox of which he is the president. According to Forbes magazine, in 2014 he ranks 13th among the richest men in Italy, and 764th in the world, with a fortune estimated at about 2.3 billion dollars.

Biography
He was born in Crocetta del Montello (Treviso), into a family of entrepreneurs active in the agricultural and winemaking sector. Following in the family footsteps, he studied oenology. For several years, the entrepreneur of the Veneto region devoted himself to the family business. In the early 1990s, when walking through the desert in Nevada, where he was taking part in a wine fair, to relieve his feet that were overheated due to the rubber-soled shoes he was wearing, he made holes in both soles with a Swiss army knife. When he returned to Italy, he designed a new sole with holes and a breathable and waterproof internal membrane. He was the first person in the world to create a breathable rubber sole, which was immediately patented in over 100 countries worldwide. Mario Moretti Polegato began to think of the scope that his idea might have if launched on a large scale. Therefore, he established Geox in order to produce the shoe that breathes. The company, which employed 5 young graduates at the outset, now has about 30,000 direct and indirect employees. Today, Geox is known worldwide for its technologies and is present in the fashion streets and main shopping centres of 105 countries, through a network of over 1,250 single-brand stores, as well as 400 stores in China. Geox is the leading Italian company and among major world leaders in the "lifestyle" footwear category.

During his working life, Mario Moretti Polegato has received many acknowledgements including Knight of the National Order of Merit from the President of Romania in 2000. In 2002, he was nominated Entrepreneur of the Year – a title given to him by Ernst & Young – and in 2003 he received the Best Italian Entrepreneur in the World award, also from Ernst & Young Global. In 2005, the former Italian President Carlo Azeglio Ciampi bestowed him the title of Cavaliere del Lavoro della Repubblica Italiana (Knight of Labour), whereas in 2006 the Italian President Giorgio Napolitano awarded him the title of Grande Ufficiale della Repubblica (Great Officer of the Republic). The European School of Management Italia (ESCP-EAP) named him Affiliate Professor of Entrepreneurship.

In 2010, he received the European Business Leader Award (EBLA) for the Innovator of the Year category, an acknowledgement that the Financial Times and the CNBC bestow on key players in the global economy every year.
He was appointed as member of the international panel of judges for the "European Inventor Award", organised by the European Patent Office (EPO), which selects and awards the best patented inventions worldwide every year.

He has held the diplomatic position of Honorary Consul General of Romania for North-East Italy since 1997, and he has been a member of the Executive Board of Confindustria (General Confederation of Italian Industry) since 2003. He has always devoted part of his time to teaching students and young entrepreneurs about "Intellectual Property" at the most prestigious universities in Italy and around the world. He is a member of the Board of Directors of the Bocconi University of Milan, and since 2014 he has been the President of the International Advisory Board of Cardenal Herrera University of Valencia, of which he is an Honorary Professor. In July 2014, he became a member of the Regency Council of the Bank of Italy.

He received the America Award of the Italy-USA Foundation in 2015.

The Group
Mario Moretti Polegato is the President of the Geox Group, which he founded. It is the major Italian company in the comfortable footwear sector and the third footwear company in the world in the "lifestyle" footwear sector. For his company he chose the name "Geox", which combines the word geo ("earth" in Greek), with the letter x, which stands for technology. Therefore, right from the outset the choice of the brand shows the highly innovative vocation of the company in the footwear sector worldwide. This vocation is confirmed by the fact that Geox invests 2% of its turnover, every year, in research and experimenting with new ideas. After achieving great success in the footwear sector, Geox has also used its own brand to produce clothing with new breathable technologies. In 2004, Geox was listed on the Borsa Italiana.

Mario Moretti Polegato is the President of LIR Srl, the finance company based in Treviso, which is entirely owned by the family. Through this company, he controls Geox and Diadora, the Italian brand that represents sport worldwide, which was taken over in 2009 and is led by his son Enrico. LIR Srl is also active in the finance and real estate sectors.

Honour
Oenologist of the Italian Republic from the Minister of Agricultural Policies;
Honorary master's degree in Integrated Logistics and Supply Chain Integrated Management from the University of Verona, Faculty of Economics and Business;
Honorary Doctorate from the University of Agricultural Science and Veterinary Medicine of Banatului, Timișoara (Romania);
Honorary Degree from the Ecological University of Bucharest, Faculty of Law;
Honorary master's degree from Cà Foscari University of Venice in Chemistry and Environmental Compatibility;
Honorary master's degree in Business Administration from the CUOA foundation – University Centre of Business Administration of Vicenza;
Honorary Degree from the University of Florence in Economics;
Honorary Degree from Cardenal Herrera University of Valencia in Industrial Design and Product Development Engineering.

See also

Montebelluna
Classifica degli uomini più ricchi d'Italia secondo Forbes
Organizzazione europea dei Brevetti

References

External links
Geox Website
Geox Group society Information

Geox
1952 births
Living people
Italian businesspeople